The BFW M.27, sometimes known as the Messerschmitt M.27, was a German two-seat sports plane with a low, cantilever wing, open cockpits and a fixed undercarriage sold in small numbers at the start of the 1930s.

Development
In the late 1920s and early 1930s, Willy Messerschmitt, working at Bayerische Flugzeugwerke (BFW) produced a series of low-wing sports monoplanes with either one or two seats. These were the M.19, M.23, M.27, M.31 and M.35 with the M.23, the only one with sales of much over double figures. The M stood for Messerschmitt.

The M.27 was a two-seater, very similar to the M.23b but with a more rounded fin and rudder assembly, a fuselage stretched by about 1,400 mm (55 in) to accommodate luggage and a new, spatted undercarriage. Pilot and passenger sat in tandem in separate open cockpits.

It was successfully raced, winning the Deutschland Competition in 1932 and coming second in the Zugspitz Circuit in 1933. Nonetheless, it was not sold in large numbers.

Variants
M.27a  Siemens Sh 12 radial engine or  Argus As 8B four-cylinder air-cooled inverted inline engine delivering  (continuous).
M.27b Argus As 8R four-cylinder high-compression air-cooled inverted inline sport engine delivering  (continuous).

Specifications (M.27b)

References

Citations

1930s German sport aircraft
M 27
Low-wing aircraft
Single-engined tractor aircraft
Aircraft first flown in 1930